The Monument to the Peaceful Liberation of Tibet stands in the southern part of the Potala square in Lhasa, Tibet Autonomous Region just outside the protective zone and buffer zone of the World Heritage Site. It celebrates what the People's Republic of China calls the Peaceful Liberation of Tibet by the People's Liberation Army, or what the exiled Tibetan government calls the invasion and annexation of Tibet. The foundation stone was laid on July 18, 2001 by Hu Jintao, China's vice-president at the time. The monument was unveiled on May 22, 2002.

The US $1.7 million, 37-meter-high spire-like concrete structure was designed by Professor Qikang of the Southeast University in Nanjing, China. The monument abstractly portrays Mount Everest. The monument bears its own name engraved in the calligraphy of former general secretary and president Jiang Zemin, while an inscription refers to the expelling of "imperialist" forces from Tibet in 1951 (a reference to long-running Anglo-Russian Great-Game designs on the region) and reports on the socio-economic development achieved since then.

When apprised of the plans to build the memorial, the Tibetan government in exile claimed that "the monument would serve as a daily reminder of the humiliation of the Tibetan people." Kate Saunders, then spokeswoman for International Campaign for Tibet, said the construction in this sensitive spot is a political message to Tibetans about Chinese rule over the region.

Gallery

See also
 Annexation of Tibet by the People's Republic of China
History of Tibet (1950–present)
Tibet (1912–1951)
Oppression

References

2002 establishments in China
Buildings and structures completed in 2002
Buildings and structures in Lhasa
Monuments and memorials in China
Tourist attractions in Tibet